Lakarabad-e Sofla (also Romanized as Lakarābād-e Soflá; also known as Lakarābād-e Pā'īn) is a village in Angut-e Gharbi Rural District, Anguti District, Germi County, Ardabil Province, Iran. At the 2006 census, its population was 195, in 38 families.

References 

Tageo

Towns and villages in Germi County